Luksika Kumkhum was the defending champion, but chose not to participate.

Vitalia Diatchenko won the title for the second time, defeating Tímea Babos in the final, 6–3, 6–2.

Seeds

Draw

Finals

Top half

Bottom half

Qualifying

Seeds

Qualifiers

Qualifying draw

First qualifier

Second qualifier

Third qualifier

Fourth qualifier

References

External links
Main Draw
Qualifying Draw

OEC Taipei WTA Challenger - Singles
Taipei WTA Ladies Open